Diego Cristín and Eduardo Schwank were the defending champions, but Schwank decided not to participate this year.
As a result, Cristín partnered with Diego Junqueira, however they were eliminated by Franco Ferreiro and André Sá in the first round.
Second seeds Daniel Muñoz-de la Nava and Rubén Ramírez Hidalgo won in the final 6–4, 6–2, against Nikola Ćirić and Goran Tošić.

Seeds

Draw

Draw

External links
 Main Draw

Copa Petrobras Santiago - Doubles
2010 Doubles